Tonga first participated at the Paralympic Games in 2000, and has sent athletes to compete in every Summer Paralympic Games since then. The country has never taken part in the Winter Paralympics.

Two athletes have represented Tonga at the Paralympics: Alailupe Valeti in the shot put in 2000 and 2004, and Mounga Okusitino in sprinting in 2008.

Full results for Tonga at the Paralympics

See also
 Tonga at the Olympics

References